Georgemas is an area in the county of Caithness, in the Highland area of Scotland.

Georgemas may also refer to:

 St. George's Day, also known as Georgemas
 International Book Day, also known as Georgemas
 Georgemas Junction railway station serving the village of Halkirk, Scotland
 Georgemas, a now-historic St. George's Day agricultural fair on Sordale Hill in the county of Caithness, in the Highland area of Scotland